In mathematics, the signature defect of a singularity measures the correction that a singularity contributes to the signature theorem.
 introduced the signature defect for the cusp singularities of Hilbert modular surfaces.

defined the signature defect of the boundary of a manifold as the eta invariant, the value as s = 0 of their eta function, and used this to show that Hirzebruch's signature defect of a cusp of a Hilbert modular surface can be expressed in terms of the value at s = 0 or 1 of a Shimizu L-function.

References

Singularity theory